Renée Witterstaetter, sometimes credited as Eva Renee Witterstaetter, is an American comic book colorist, editor, producer, and writer. She has worked on comics such as the Avengers, Spider-Man, She-Hulk, and Superman. She is best known for her work as an editor with John Byrne on the Marvel Comics series The Sensational She-Hulk. Witterstaetter was also featured as a fourth wall breaking character in the same series.

Career 

Witterstaetter started her career as an assistant editor at DC Comics working on the Superman comics. She later worked at Marvel Comics on Silver Surfer and Conan. While at Marvel she was a colorist on many series including the Avengers, Spider-Man, and Captain America. As a colorist her influences include Maxfield Parrish.

Bibliography 

As an editor Witterstaetter's work includes:

DC Comics 
 Superman

Marvel Comics 
 Silver Surfer
 Savage Sword of Conan
 The Sensational She-Hulk

Topps Comics 
 Hercules
 Jurassic Park
 Jason Vs. Leatherface
 Spartan X
 Xena
 X-Files

Other publishers 
As an author:
 Dying for Action: The Life and Films of Jackie Chan
 Excess: The Art of Michael Golden
 Kerry and the Scary Things
 Nick Cardy: The Artist at War
 Nick Cardy: Wit-Lash
 Tex: The Art of Mark Texeira

References

External links 

Year of birth missing (living people)
Living people
Marvel Comics people
Comic book editors
American comics writers
DC Comics people
Women print editors